is a Japanese video game composer and sound editor who has worked for Square Enix since 2001. Soken is best known for being the lead composer and sound director of Final Fantasy XIV and its expansions, as well as the composer for Final Fantasy XVI.

Biography
Born in La Paz, Baja California Sur, Mexico, Soken and his family later moved to Tokyo, where he attended the Tokyo University of Science, majoring in chemistry. He was exposed to music at a young age—his father was a professional trumpet player and his mother taught piano. Rather than pursue a career in science, he was hired as a sound editor and designer at Konami. He joined Square in 1998 and his early work at the company primarily focused on sound effect design, rather than composition. He assisted Kenji Ito on sports video games such as Gekikuukan Pro Baseball: The End of the Century 1999. His debut as a composer came with the Japan-exclusive sports games Nichibeikan Pro Baseball: Final League, in which he was the sole composer, and World Fantasista with synthesizer programmer Takeharu Ishimoto.

In 2005, Soken worked on Drakengard 2 and Front Mission 5: Scars of the War. The following year, Soken composed and arranged the score to Mario Hoops 3-on-3. Along with Kenji Ito and Tsuyoshi Sekito, he created the soundtrack to Dawn of Mana (known as "Seiken Densetsu 4" in Japan), with Academy Award-winning composer Ryuichi Sakamoto providing the main theme. Soken also arranged a few tracks from previous Mana games, and performed the electric guitar for his arrangements. In 2007, he scored the online game Elebest with Ai Yamashita.

Soken has also contributed to Square Enix advertisements; Front Mission 5: Scars of the War (2005) featured the sports commercial song "Blue Stream", Soken's only composition in the game. He also participated in a Square Enix advertisement for pencils where he got beaten up by two robots; the commercial featured music composed by him. Soken created the fanfare for Square Enix Music TV, a monthly video feature where new album releases are discussed and interviews with Square Enix composers are conducted. For the iTunes-exclusive Square Enix Music Official Bootleg collection, Soken contributed the piece "Dog Street" for the first volume in 2006, and "Languid Afternoon" for the third volume in 2007; he went under the alias "Sorbonne Soken" on the third volume. In 2008, he composed the Japan-exclusive Nanashi no Game, this time under the pseudonym "Luis Noma". In 2010, he composed another sports game for the Wii, Mario Sports Mix.

Since the 2010 development team reshuffling, he has been sound director for Final Fantasy XIV. Soken became primary composer for the title with the launch of A Realm Reborn and the expansions that followed. He formed a rock band called The Primals with members of the sound team to play at Final Fantasy XIV events such as Fan Festival. The Primals have since released several albums starting with Final Fantasy XIV: From Astral to Umbral. Following Nobuo Uematsu's illness in 2018, Soken composed the main theme for Shadowbringers. With the previous expansions' main theme songs having previously been composed by Uematsu, this made Shadowbringers soundtrack the first in the Final Fantasy XIV series to be entirely written by Soken.

In May 2021, during the Final Fantasy XIV Digital Fan Festival, Soken announced that he had been receiving chemotherapy for cancer treatment throughout most of 2020, adding that the cancer was in remission. Soken kept the treatment hidden from most of the development team, doing some of his work for Final Fantasy XIV from hospital.

In September 2020, Square Enix announced that Final Fantasy XVI was in development for PlayStation 5. Though not detailed initially, in June 2022, further information was revealed, including that Soken would be the game's lead composer.

Musical style and influences
Soken primarily approaches his game composing with the player's experience in mind. When tasked with arranging Final Fantasy music originally composed by Nobuo Uematsu, he takes extra care to achieve this goal. Soken credits his experience as a sound designer, sound editor, and voice editor for helping him handle the pressure of the Final Fantasy XIV remake. He primarily composes using piano and keyboard but prefers playing guitar in live performances.

Soken's favorite bands are Rage Against the Machine and Pennywise.

Works

References

External links
Square Enix profile

1975 births
Japanese composers
Japanese male composers
Japanese sound designers
Living people
Sound editors
Square Enix people
Video game composers